The 2008 TC 2000 Championship was the 30th Turismo Competicion 2000 season.

Final standings

Top 10

Race calendar and winners

References

External links
Official site (Spanish)

TC 2000 Championship seasons
TC 2000 season
TC 2000 season